Mohammad Daneshgar (born 20 January 1994) is an Iranian footballer who plays as a defender for 
Sepahan in the Persian Gulf Pro League.

Club career

Fajr Sepasi
After shining in the 2012 AFC U-19 Championship he was promoted to the first team by Mahmoud Yavari. He made his debut for Fajr Sepasi in a match against Sepahan in the 2013–14 Iran Pro League as a starter.

Naft Tehran
Daneshgar joined Naft Tehran with a three-year contract on 27 June 2015.

Esteghlal
On 2 June 2018, Daneshgar signed for Esteghlal.

Club career statistics

International career

U20
He was part of Iran U–20 during 2012 AFC U-19 Championship qualification, 2012 CIS Cup, 2012 AFF U-19 Youth Championship and 2012 AFC U-19 Championship.

U23
He was invited to the Iran U-23 training camp by Nelo Vingada to prepare for Incheon 2014 and 2016 AFC U-22 Championship (Summer Olympic qualification). He was named in Iran's final squad for Incheon 2014.

Honours
Naft Tehran
Hazfi Cup: 2016–17

Esteghlal
Iran Pro League: 2021–22
Hazfi Cup runner-up: 2019–20, 2020–21

References

External links
 Mohammad Daneshgar at PersianLeague

1994 births
Living people
Iranian footballers
Fajr Sepasi players
Naft Tehran F.C. players
Esteghlal F.C. players
Sepahan S.C. footballers
People from Borazjan
Iran under-20 international footballers
Association football defenders
Footballers at the 2014 Asian Games
Asian Games competitors for Iran